Lieutenant-Colonel Henry Mortimer Poulton  (23 April 1898 – 1 September 1973) was a British Indian Army and Indian Political Service officer. He was Chief Commissioner of Balochistan in 1946, shortly before Indian independence.

Commissioned into the Indian Army in 1917, he joined the Indian Political Department in 1922.

References
POULTON, Lt-Col Henry Mortimer, Who Was Who, A & C Black, 1920–2015 (online edition, Oxford University Press, 2014)

1973 deaths
1898 births
Chief Commissioners of Baluchistan
Indian Political Service officers
Companions of the Order of the Indian Empire
British Indian Army officers